Xanthophyllum rectum is a tree in the family Polygalaceae. The specific epithet  is from the Latin meaning "upright", referring to the inflorescences.

Description
The smooth bark is pale grey.

Distribution and habitat
Xanthophyllum rectum is endemic to Borneo and confined to Sarawak. Its habitats include kerangas and dipterocarp forests.

References

rectum
Endemic flora of Borneo
Trees of Borneo
Flora of Sarawak
Plants described in 2005